The Bayonne Community News is a weekly community newspaper serving Bayonne, in Hudson County, New Jersey. The paper is one of nine weekly publications produced by The Hudson Reporter Assoc., L.P.

The Community News was founded in 1978 by publisher Edward Kukowski, who sold the paper to the Hudson Reporter in 2004. The company's main office is located in Bayonne, but the Community News.

Hudson Reporter publications focus on local politics, longform journalism, and community news. The newspaper prints editorials, feature stories, columns, and letters to the editor.

See also
The Jersey Journal
 The Observer
 El Especialito
List of newspapers in New Jersey

References

External links
Bayonne Community News, official site

Bayonne, New Jersey
Mass media in Hudson County, New Jersey
Newspapers published in New Jersey
Newspapers established in 1978